Lee Hyun-Ho (born 29 November 1988) is a South Korean football player who currently plays for Daejeon Citizen.

External links

1988 births
Living people
Association football forwards
South Korean footballers
Ulsan Hyundai Mipo Dockyard FC players
Jeju United FC players
Seongnam FC players
Daejeon Hana Citizen FC players
K League 1 players
Korea National League players